Deutscher Schriftstellerverband (DSV, "German Writers' Union") was an East German association of writers. It was founded in 1950 and renamed in 1973 as Schriftstellerverband der DDR.

The association considered itself an heir to the earlier traditions of the SDS ("Protection League of German Writers") which had flourished in the 1920s but then, after 1933, been forced into line under the Hitler dictatorship and, in July 1933, found itself subsumed into the "National Association of German Writers" (Reichsverband deutscher Schriftsteller), a Nazi mandated successor organisation  between 1933 and 1945.

The DSV archives are now in the Academy of Arts Berlin.

Presidents 

Bodo Uhse (1950–1952)
Anna Seghers (1952–1978)
Hermann Kant (1978–1990)
Rainer Kirsch (1990)

See also
"Die Lösung", which mentions the Schriftstellerverband

Organizations established in 1950
Organisations based in East Germany
East German literature
East Germany
1950 establishments in East Germany
1990 disestablishments in East Germany